List of places burned during the Balkan Wars (1912-1913) is a list of places totally or partly burned during the Balkan Wars (1912-1913).

Table

Bibliography 

 

Balkan Wars
Balkans-related lists